Dean James Magee (born April 29, 1955, in Banff, Alberta) is a former Canadian ice hockey centre. He played 7 games in the National Hockey League with the Minnesota North Stars during the 1977–78 season and 5 games in the World Hockey Association with the Indianapolis Racers during the 1978–79 season.

Career statistics

Regular season and playoffs

External links
 

1955 births
Living people
Calgary Canucks players
Canadian ice hockey centres
Colorado College Tigers men's ice hockey players
Fort Worth Texans players
Grand Rapids Owls players
Houston Apollos players
Ice hockey people from Alberta
Indianapolis Racers players
Minnesota North Stars draft picks
Minnesota North Stars players
People from Banff, Alberta